Mehdiabad (also Romanized as Mehdīābād) is a village in Baghestan Rural District, in the Central District of Bavanat County, Fars Province, Iran. At the 2006 census, its population was 315, in 67 families.

References 

Populated places in Bavanat County